The Shuangfeng dialect is a dialect of Xiang Chinese, spoken in Shuangfeng County, Hunan province, China.

Phonology

Consonants

Vowels

Tones
Phonemically, Shuangfeng dialect has three tones. Phonetically, however, the pitch of a syllable depends on the voicing of the initial consonant so the tones are counted as five:

See also

 Xiang Chinese
 List of Chinese dialects

References
Běijīng dàxué zhōngguó yǔyán wénxué xì yǔyán xué jiàoyánshì. (1989) Hànyǔ fāngyīn zìhuì. Běijīng: Wénzì gǎigé chūbǎn shè.(北京大學中國語言文學系語言學教研室. 1989. 漢語方音字匯. 北京: 文字改革出版社)
Coblin, W. South. (2011). Comparative Phonology of the Central Xiāng Dialects. Taipei: Institute of Linguistics, Academia Sinica.
Norman, Jerry. [1988] (2002). Chinese. Cambridge, England: CUP 
Wu, Yunji. (2005). A Synchronic and diachronic study of the grammar of the Chinese Xiang dialects. Berlin, New York: Mouton de Gruyter. 
Yuán, jiāhuá (1989). Hànyǔ fāngyán gàiyào (An introduction to Chinese dialects). Beijing, China: Wénzì gǎigé chūbǎn shè. (袁家驊. 1989. 漢語方言概要. 北京:文字改革出版社.)

External links
 Cantonese and other dialects (in Chinese)
 Classification of Xiang Dialects from Glossika

Xiang Chinese